Yannchen Hoffmann (born 21 July 1961) is a Luxembourgian mezzo-soprano. Her father is composer Julien Hoffmann.

References

1961 births
Living people
20th-century Luxembourgian women singers
21st-century Luxembourgian women singers